The 1929–30 City Cup was the thirty-second edition of the City Cup, a cup competition in Northern Irish football.

The tournament was won by Belfast Celtic for the 5th time. They defeated Glentoran 3–1 in a test match at Grosvenor Park after both teams finished level on points in the group standings.

Group standings

Test match

References

1929–30 in Northern Ireland association football